Packy or Packie may refer to:

People:
 Packy Axton (1941–1974), American rhythm and blues tenor saxophone player and bandleader
 Packie Bonner (born 1960), former football goalkeeper for the Republic of Ireland
 Packie Duignan (1922–1992), Irish flute player
 Packy East, boxing ring name of comedian Bob Hope
 Packy Hyland Jr., founder of Hyland Software in 1991
 Pat McAllister (born 1972), Northern Irish football manager and former player
 Pascal McConnell (born 1980), former Gaelic football goalkeeper
 Packey McFarland (1888–1936), Irish-American boxer
 Packy McGarty (1933–2021), Gaelic football player
 Packy Naughton (born 1996), American baseball player
 Packie Russell (1920–1977), Irish musician and storyteller
 Henry A. Schade (1900–1992), US Navy commodore, naval architect and professor

Animals:
 Packy (elephant) (1962–2017)

Fictional characters:
 Packy, in the Sony PlayStation game Puzzle Bobble 4
 Packy Franklyn, protagonist of the 1932 novel Hot Water by P.G. Wodehouse
 Patrick "Packie" McReary, in the video game Grand Theft Auto IV
 Sergeant Perkins, one of the main characters in the manga series Apocalypse Meow

Other:
 "Packie", a slang term for a "package store" (i.e. a liquor store) in Massachusetts

See also
 Paki (slur), British slang word for a Pakistani person

Lists of people by nickname